Atyashevo (Otäžele) is an urban locality (a work settlement) and the administrative center of Atyashevsky District of the Republic of Mordovia, Russia. As of the 2010 Census, its population was 6,246.

History
It was founded in 1894; urban-type settlement status was granted to it in 1963.

Administrative and municipal status
Within the framework of administrative divisions, Atyashevo serves as the administrative center of Atyashevsky District. As an administrative division, the work settlement of Atyashevo is incorporated within Atyashevsky District as Atyashevo Work Settlement. As a municipal division, Atyashevo Work Settlement is incorporated within Atyashevsky Municipal District as Atyashevskoye Urban Settlement.

References

Notes

Sources

Urban-type settlements in Mordovia
Atyashevsky District
Ardatovsky Uyezd (Simbirsk Governorate)